Paraty (or Parati) is a preserved Portuguese colonial (1500–1822) and Brazilian Imperial (1822–1889) municipality with a population of about 43,000. Indeed, the name "Paraty"  originates from the local Guaianá Indians' Indigenous Tupi language, inspired by an abundant local fish native to the region. Paraty is located on the Costa Verde (Green Coast), a lush green corridor that runs along the coastline of the state of Rio de Janeiro, in Brazil. Paraty has become a tourist destination, known for its historic town center and the coast and mountains in the region. The historic center of the city, as well as four areas of the Atlantic Forest, were inscribed on UNESCO World Heritage List in 2019 under the title "Paraty and Ilha Grande".

Geography 
The town is located on the Bay of Ilha Grande, which is dotted with many tropical islands. Rising as high as 1,300 meters behind the town are tropical forests, mountains, and waterfalls. It is the southernmost and westernmost city in Rio de Janeiro state.

Paraty is listed by IPHAN as a National Historic Landmark.
More than 80% of its territory is protected by conservation units:
Cairuçu Environmental Protection Area, where the village of Trindade is located
Tamoios Ecological Station
Serra da Bocaina National Park
Baia de Paraty, Paraty Mirim and Saco do Mamanguá Environmental Protection Area
Juatinga Ecological Reserve
Nearby is the Serra do Mar State Park of São Paulo. 
The municipality also includes an indigenous village and an Afro-Brazilian quilombo settlement.

Climate 
Its wettest month is February. However, sea breezes temper the heat and afternoon rains are common in the summer.

Municipal symbols

Flag 
The flag of Paraty was adopted on August 12, 1967. The overall colors of the flag represent the following traits: gold signifies strength, silver represents innocence, red is bravery, blue serenity, and green is the color of abundance.

Red, white, and blue are the three colors that have traditionally been used to decorate the historic houses of the city. The colors are displayed in three vertical stripes, with a coat of arms on the center. The large white star on the red stripe symbolizes the first district, and on the blue stripe two small stars represent the second and third districts. The three stars are placed in a triangular form, in homage to the strong presence of Freemasonry in the architecture of the city. The crown represents the royal traditions that discovered the country and founded the independent country. The real reason for green is the Portuguese house of Bragança and yellow for the Austrian house of Habsburg (Dom Pedro I and Dona Leopoldina).

Coat of arms 
The coat of arms shown on the flag was adopted on November 30, 1960. The four quarters of the coat of arms symbolize the following:

 The first green-colored quarter on the upper left-hand side with a feathered headdress above two crossed arrows, represents the original inhabitants of the region, the Guaianás tribe.
 The second quarter in red with a white oval seal with the royal Portuguese coat of arms surrounded by the word "Remédios," a seal which was used in colonial times to authenticate official documents; Our Lady of Remedies has been patron saint of the town since 1646.
 The third quarter, which is white, blue and yellow is an outline of the city and the bay with a superimposed silver fish that is perhaps a reference to Tupi language  origin of the city name.
 Finally the fourth quarter of blue shows the corner of a colonial house and a wrought-iron rail which is representative of the colonial-style houses that exemplify Paraty.

The flora which supports the red scroll are a branch of coffee tree and a stalk of sugarcane. The scroll itself bears the inscription “1660 Paraty 1844” These are the dates that Paraty initially achieved status as a town and then later city status. Above the shield is a crown consisting of five towers, with the center tower emblazoned with a red shield bearing a gold fleur-de-lis, which symbolizes Our Lady of Remedies, the patron saint of the city.

History 
The village of Paraty was founded in 1597.  It was established formally as a town by Portuguese colonists in 1667, in a region populated by the Guaianás Indians.

The Guaianás people who lived where the city now stands called the entire area “Paraty”. In the Tupi language “Paraty” means “river of fish”. Even today the Brazilian Mullet (Mugil brasiliensis) still come back to spawn in the rivers that spill into the Bay of Paraty. When the region was colonized by the Portuguese, they adopted the Guaianás name for their new town.

The Gold Trail 
After the discovery of the world's richest gold mines in 1696 in the mountains of Minas Gerais, Paraty became an export port for gold to Rio de Janeiro and from there on to Portugal. The ensuing gold rush led to the construction of the "Caminho do Ouro" or "Gold Trail", a 1200 kilometer road, paved in steep areas with large stones, which connected Paraty to Diamantina via Ouro Preto and Tiradentes. Not only was it used to transport gold to Paraty, but it was also used to convey supplies, miners and African slaves by mule train over the mountains to and from the gold mining areas. Two sections of the Caminho do Ouro have been excavated near Paraty and are now a tourist destination for hiking.

The Gold Trail fell into disuse because of attacks on the gold laden ships bound for Rio de Janeiro by pirates who frequented the islands and coves of the Bay of Angra dos Reis. Eventually a safer overland route from Minas Gerais to Rio de Janeiro was created because of these pirate raids. Finally, the gold itself began to run out in the late 18th century, and Paraty declined.

The Gold Trail was submitted for inclusion on the World Heritage List in August 2004.

Economic revival 
The city's economic activity revived as a port for a new boom, the coffee trade of the Paraiba do Sul River Valley in the early 19th century, until a railway along the valley created cheaper transport to the port of Rio de Janeiro. Another smaller revival came late in the 19th century with the production of cachaça, which is a sugarcane-derived spirit best known today as the basis for Brazil's most famous cocktail, the caipirinha. The name "Paraty" in that period became synonymous with cachaça.
Since then, Paraty has been out of the mainstream, which is why it did not change for centuries, until a paved road was built from Rio de Janeiro to Santos, near São Paulo, in the 1970s. The city then began a new cycle of activity, which transformed a small, almost abandoned town living on very limited economic activity, mainly fishing and agriculture (bananas, manioc, sugarcane) into a tourism destination.

Architecture 
Paraty is known for the cobblestone-paved streets throughout the Historic Center District. No cars or trucks are allowed in this part of town, only foot traffic or bicycles. Motor vehicles are only allowed in the Historic District on Wednesdays for deliveries. Horses and carts are a very common sight in Paraty and are frequently used all around the city.

Paraty has been able to maintain many of its historic buildings. Much of the architecture of the city has not changed for 250 years or more.

Churches 
There are four important historic baroque churches in Paraty:

Chapel of Saint Rita 
Capela de Santa Rita is the oldest church in Paraty. It was completed in 1722. This was the church of the freed slaves and freeman, former slaves. It is currently home to the Museum of Sacred Art.

Church of Nossa Senhora do Rosário e São Benedito 
This church was built and used by Paraty's African slaves. It dates back to the year 1725. The church has a much simpler, more rustic style than the other three churches in Paraty. Every year in the first week of December the festivities of São Benedito are held in this church.

Chapel of Nossa Senhora das Dores 
This chapel dates back to 1800. It was used mostly by the rich women of society. Construction was overseen by the presiding priest, Father Antonio Xavier da Silva Braga. The building was later renovated in 1901. The image of Nossa Senhora da Piedade was stolen from this chapel. It was finally recovered in the 1990s, and now can be seen at the Museum of Sacred Art in the Capela de Santa Rita.

Church of Nossa Senhora dos Remédios 
Igreja Matriz Nossa Senhora dos Remédios is the largest church in Paraty. It takes up over an entire city block. Its construction began in 1646 when a woman named Maria Jácome de Melo donated the land for the construction of the village of Paraty, however she demanded two conditions: The first was the building of a chapel dedicated to Nossa Senhora dos Remédios and the second was that no one would harm the Indians that lived in the area at that time. The church was completed in 1873.

Chapel of the Generosa 

Additionally, there is a very small chapel called Capela da Generosa which according to legend, was constructed in 1901 by the order of a generous female patron, in memory of Teodoro. Teodoro supposedly drowned in the river Perequê-Açu when he tried to fish on Good Friday, a day on which according to tradition it was not recommended to fish.

Chapel of Nossa Senhora da Conceição 

There are also historical churches in two nearby small villages, Paraty Mirim and Penha.

Paraty-Mirim (Little Paraty) is the site of first chapel built by settlers in the region around Paraty (1686). At the time of its construction Paraty-Mirim an important commercial center and thriving village. Today however, all that remains there are the church itself and a scattering private homes. Although in recent years the tourist trade has grown there due to the pristine beaches in the area and Paraty-Mirim now has a few small inns, a couple of restaurant/bars and offers boat tours.

Church of Nossa Senhora da Penha 

This church is unique in that it was built on top of a huge boulder in the small hamlet of Penha, just outside Paraty. The church is located directly across from the Tourist Information Center at the trail-head of the Caminho do Ouro.

Forts 
There are two colonial forts in Paraty: Forte Defensor and Forte Patitiba.

Forte Defensor 
Forte Defensor was built in 1703 and outfitted with six cannons for the protection of the city's important commercial warehouses. With the aforementioned economic decline of the region, it was in ruins until 1822, when it was reconstructed and dedicated to Emperor Dom Pedro I. Some historians believe that it was at the fort that the first nucleus of the town began, in that the area around the fort is still referred to as the "Old Village."

Ruins of the old defensive stone walls together with the cannons can still be seen today. It is also home to a powder house for storing explosives – one of the few still existing in Brazil. Forte Defensor is one of seven fortifications that were built around the harbor of Paraty, two of them being in the city. All of the others that were constructed outside the city are now only ruins.

Forte Patitiba [Cadeia Antiga] 

What is left of this fort, also known as Cadeia Antiga (the Old Jail), is a smallish structure which for a while was also used as a prison. It is found in the plaza of Santa Rita, next to the church of same name. Constructed in the beginning of the 18th century, the building was part of a larger Forte Patitiba, the other blockhouse built in the city for defense of the harbor. In the 19th century it was decommissioned and today it houses the local public library.

There are also many colorful colonial houses (refurbished in most cases), many of which have been transformed into shops, pousadas (Brazilian bed-and-breakfasts), restaurants and bars.

Flooded Streets 
Once a month when there is a full moon and the tide is high, seawater rises above its normal levels and pours into the Historic Center District through special openings in the seawalls that separate the city from the harbor. The streets are only flooded for a short time until the tide recedes.

Neighborhoods 

Paraty is divided into 12 neighborhoods. They are as follows:

 Caboré
 Centro Historico
 Fátima
 Ilha das Cobras
 Jabaquara
 Mangueira
 Parque Imperial
 Parque Ypê
 Patitiba
 Portal de Paraty
 Saudade
 Vila Colonial

The municipality contains the Paraty-Mirim State Park, created in 1972.
It contains part of the Tamoios Ecological Station.

Culture and tourism 
There are many musical and cultural events, the most prominent of which is the FLIP – Festa Literaria Internacional de Paraty (International Literary Festival of Paraty). The town is also known for its local festivals on Catholic holy dates, such as the Feast of the Holy Ghost. 

The annual Paraty Bourbon Jazz Festival has occurred every May since 2009. The traditional music event has already brought names like Stanley Jordan, Gary Brown, Ed Motta, Leo Gandelman, Eumir Deodato, Joshua Redman, Pau Brasil Group, Dianne Reaves, Mike Stern, Naná Vasconcellos, Nuno Mindelis, Jacques Morelenbaum, Stanley Clarke, and many other leading names in jazz, blues, soul and R & B from Brazil and the world. 

The event usually has two stages, located in the Plaza de Matriz and the Santa Rita Church in the historic center of the city, as well as buskers (street performers) and Orleans Street Jazz Band circling the streets of the Historic Center and DJ Crizz that opens and closes programming every day. 

The Casa da Cultura Paraty (Paraty House of Culture) occupies an historic house originally built in 1754 which opened to the public in 2004 and holds a permanent exhibition on local history and culture. In the Salon of Indigenous Culture, visitors can see the “carpets” made of colored sawdust and flower petals used during the festival of Corpus Christi in June. The largest is almost . The “carpet” is protected by glass so that visitors walk on it as they enter.

Paraty played the part of the Bahian town of Ilhéus in the 1983 Bruno Barreto film Gabriela, Cravo e Canela, starring Sônia Braga and Marcello Mastroianni.

Paraty was also the set for Isle Esme (the place of Edward and Bella's honeymoon) in the movie The Twilight Saga: Breaking Dawn.

Transportation 

Paraty airport can be reached from Rio de Janeiro or São Paulo by chartered helicopter or small commercial and private aircraft because presently it has no scheduled flights.

Another possibility of transport is to arrive by sea by way of a sailboat or cruise ship from Rio de Janeiro, Angra dos Reis and Ilha Grande.

Paraty is connected by road to Rio de Janeiro or São Paulo (via road BR-101). Air-conditioned buses leave to go back and forth from Rio to Paraty and Paraty to Rio.

Distance from other Brazilian cities 
Angra dos Reis – 95 km
Belo Horizonte – 572 km
Caraguatatuba – 126 km
Rio de Janeiro – 236 km
São Paulo – 330 km
Ubatuba – 74 km

Other images

References

External links 

http://www.paraty.tur.br 
Caminho do Ouro – Official government operated facility 

Populated coastal places in Rio de Janeiro (state)
Populated places established in 1597
Municipalities in Rio de Janeiro (state)
World Heritage Sites in Brazil